The Kherson Regional Committee of the Communist Party of Ukraine, commonly referred to as the Kherson CPU obkom, was the position of highest authority in the Kherson Oblast, in the Ukrainian SSR of the Soviet Union. The position was created in April 1944, and abolished in August 1991. The First Secretary was a de facto appointed position usually by the Central Committee of the Communist Party of Ukraine or the First Secretary of the Communist Party of Ukraine.

List of First Secretaries of the Communist Party of Kherson

See also
Kherson Oblast

Notes

Sources
 World Statesmen.org

Regional Committees of the Communist Party of Ukraine (Soviet Union)
Ukrainian Soviet Socialist Republic
History of Kherson Oblast
1944 establishments in the Soviet Union
1991 disestablishments in the Soviet Union